Hermann Voss may refer to:

 Hermann Voss (art historian) (1884–1969) German art historian and museum director
 Hermann Voss (anatomist) (1894–1987) German anatomist and medical author
 Hermann Voss (musician) (born 1934), German violist, painter and puppet player